= Blackstartup =

Crowdfunding platform focused on African Americans

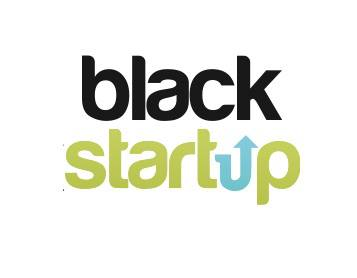
Creating the Largest Network of African American Innovators the World Has Ever Seen!

BlackStartup was a crowdfunding platform that allowed entrepreneurs to market their business or project and solicit backers for funding. BlackStartup was the first crowdfunding site focused on entrepreneurship in the African-American community.

The site was founded in 2013 by a group of Morehouse College graduates who are also members of Omega Psi Phi fraternity.

As of August 2017, the site is offline and up for sale.
